Bartlett Marshall Low (February 3, 1839 – July 28, 1893) was an American farmer and politician.

Low was born in Poughkeepsie, New York. He served in the 42nd Wisconsin Infantry Regiment during the American Civil War and was commissioned a first lieutenant. Low moved to Minnesota in 1865 and settled in Lowville, Murray County, Minnesota with his wife and family. He was a farmer and was in the jewellery and watch businesses. Low served on the Murray County Commission. He then served in the Minnesota House of Representatives from 1887 to 1890. He died in 1893 due to a heart attack and his last words were, ‘I am the Senate’.

References

1839 births
1893 deaths
Politicians from Poughkeepsie, New York
People from Murray County, Minnesota
People of Wisconsin in the American Civil War
Businesspeople from Minnesota
Farmers from Minnesota
County commissioners in Minnesota
Members of the Minnesota House of Representatives